Multiple governments have set up permanent research stations in Antarctica and these bases are widely distributed. Unlike the drifting ice stations set up in the Arctic, the research stations of the Antarctic are constructed either on rock or on ice that is (for practical purposes) fixed in place.

Many of the stations are staffed throughout the year. A total of 42 countries (as of October 2006), all signatories to the Antarctic Treaty, operate seasonal (summer) and year-round research stations on the continent. The population of people performing and supporting scientific research on the continent and nearby islands varies from approximately 4,000 during the summer season to 1,000 during winter (June). In addition to these permanent stations, approximately 30 field camps are established each summer to support specific projects.

History

First bases

During the Heroic Age of Antarctic Exploration in the late 19th century, the first bases on the continent were established. In 1898, Carsten Borchgrevink, a Norwegian/British explorer, led the British Antarctic Expedition to Cape Adare, where he established the first Antarctic base on Ridley Beach. This expedition is often referred to now as the Southern Cross Expedition, after the expedition's ship name. Most of the staff were Norwegian, but the funds for the expedition were British, provided by Sir George Newnes. The 10 members of the expedition explored Robertson Bay to the west of Cape Adare by dog teams, and later, after being picked up by the ship at the base, went ashore on the Ross Ice Shelf for brief journeys. The expedition hut is still in good condition and visited frequently by tourists.

The hut was later occupied by Scott's Northern Party under the command of Victor Campbell for a year in 1911, after its attempt to explore the eastern end of the ice shelf discovered Roald Amundsen already ashore preparing for his assault on the South Pole.

In 1903, Dr William S. Bruce's Scottish National Antarctic Expedition set off to Antarctica, with one of its aims to establish a meteorological station in the area. After the expedition failed to find land, Bruce decided to head back to the Laurie Island in the South Orkneys and find an anchorage there. The islands were well-situated as a site for a meteorological station, and their relative proximity to the South American mainland allowed a permanent station to be established. Bruce instituted a comprehensive programme of work, involving meteorological readings, trawling for marine samples, botanical excursions, and the collection of biological and geological specimens.

The major task completed during this time was the construction of a stone building, christened "Omond House". This was to act as living accommodation for the parties that would remain on Laurie Island to operate the proposed meteorological laboratory. The building was constructed from local materials using the dry stone method, with a roof improvised from wood and canvas sheeting. The completed house was 20 feet by 20 feet square (6m × 6m), with two windows, fitted as quarters for six people. Rudmose Brown wrote: "Considering that we had no mortar and no masons' tools it is a wonderfully fine house and very lasting. I should think it will be standing a century hence ..."

Bruce later offered to Argentina the transfer of the station and instruments on the condition that the government committed itself to the continuation of the scientific mission. Bruce informed the British officer William Haggard of his intentions in December 1903, and Haggard ratified the terms of Bruce's proposition.

The Scotia sailed back for Laurie Island on 14 January 1904 carrying on board Argentinean officials from the Ministry of Agriculture, National Meteorological Office, Ministry of Livestock and National Postal and Telegraphs Office. In 1906, Argentina communicated to the international community the establishment of a permanent base on the South Orkney Islands.

WWII and postwar expansion
Little happened for the following forty years until the Second World War, when the British launched Operation Tabarin in 1943, to establish a presence on the continent. The chief reason was to establish solid British claims to various uninhabited islands and parts of Antarctica, reinforced by Argentine sympathies toward Germany.

Prior to the start of the war, German aircraft had dropped markers with swastikas across Queen Maud Land in an attempt to create a territorial claim (New Swabia). Led by Lieutenant James Marr, the 14-strong team left the Falkland Islands in two ships, HMS William Scoresby (a minesweeping trawler) and HMS Fitzroy, on Saturday January 29, 1944. Marr had accompanied the British explorer Sir Ernest Shackleton on his final Antarctic expedition in 1921–22.

Bases were established during February near the abandoned Norwegian whaling station on Deception Island, where the Union Flag was hoisted in place of Argentine flags, and at Port Lockroy (on February 11) on the coast of Graham Land. A further base was founded at Hope Bay on February 13, 1945, after a failed attempt to unload stores on February 7, 1944. These bases were the first ever to be constructed on the mainland Antarctica.

The United States starting under the leadership of Admiral Richard E. Byrd constructed a series of five bases near the Bay of Whales named Little America between 1929 and 1958. All of them have now drifted off to sea on icebergs.

A massive expansion in international activity followed the war. Chile organized its First Chilean Antarctic Expedition in 1947–48. Among other accomplishments, it brought the Chilean president Gabriel González Videla to personally inaugurate one of its bases, thereby becoming the first head of state to set foot on the continent. Signy Research Station (UK) was established in 1947, Australia's Mawson Station in 1954, Dumont d'Urville Station was the first French station in 1956. In that same year, the United States built McMurdo Station and Amundsen–Scott South Pole Station, and the Soviet Union built Mirny Station.

Permanent active stations
The United States maintains the southernmost base, Amundsen–Scott South Pole Station, and the largest base and research station in Antarctica, McMurdo Station. The second-southernmost base is the Chinese Kunlun Station at 80°25′02″S during the summer season, and the Russian Vostok Station at 78°27′50″S during the winter season.

Subantarctic stations

Summer-only active stations

Maps of active stations

Inactive stations

See also

Antarctic field camps
Demographics of Antarctica
Territorial claims in Antarctica
List of airports in Antarctica
List of research stations in the Arctic (for analogous stations in the Arctic)
List of Antarctic expeditions
Transport in Antarctica
Time in Antarctica
Winter-over syndrome
Human outpost

Notes

References

External links
 
 Research stations
 COMNAP Antarctic Facilities, 2014, Excel file
 COMNAP Antarctic Facilities Map, 2009
 Antarctic Exploration Timeline, animated map of Antarctic exploration and settlement, showing where and when Antarctic research stations were established
 Antarctic Digital Database Map Viewer SCAR

 
Antarctica-related lists
Government research
Science and technology in Antarctica
Antarctic research
Research-related lists